is a Japanese former football player.

Club career
Noda was born in Muroran on March 19, 1969. After graduating from Kokushikan University, he joined Nissan Motors (later Yokohama Marinos) in 1991. In 1992, he became a regular player as defensive midfielder. The club won the champions 1991, 1992 Emperor's Cup and 1995 J1 League. In Asia, the club won the champions 1991–92 and 1992–93 Asian Cup Winners' Cup. In 1999, he moved to Avispa Fukuoka. Although he played as regular player, the club was relegated to J2 League in 2002. In 2002, his opportunity to play decreased and he moved to Regional Leagues club Volca Kagoshima in 2003. He retired end of 2004 season.

National team career
In 1988, when Noda was a Kokushikan University student, he was selected Japan national "B team" for 1988 Asian Cup. At this competition, he played 1 game. However, Japan Football Association don't count as Japan national team match because this Japan team was "B team" not "top team"

Futsal career
In 1989, Noda selected Japan national futsal team for 1989 Futsal World Championship in Netherlands.

Club statistics

References

External links

1969 births
Living people
Kokushikan University alumni
Association football people from Hokkaido
Japanese footballers
Japanese men's futsal players
Japan Soccer League players
J1 League players
J2 League players
Yokohama F. Marinos players
Avispa Fukuoka players
1988 AFC Asian Cup players
Association football midfielders
People from Muroran, Hokkaido